Paul Annacone and Christo van Rensburg were the defending champions. Annacone competed alongside Kelly Evernden but lost in the semifinals, while van Rensburg played with Kevin Curren and lost in the quarterfinals.Darren Cahill and Mark Kratzmann won the title, defeating Udo Riglewski and Michael Stich 7–5, 6–2, in the final.

Seeds
All seeds receive a bye into the second round. 

  Pieter Aldrich /  Danie Visser (second round)
  Kevin Curren /  Christo van Rensburg (quarterfinals)
  Darren Cahill /  Mark Kratzmann (champions)
  Neil Broad /  Gary Muller (quarterfinals)
  Paul Annacone /  Kelly Evernden (semifinals)
  Grant Connell /  Glenn Michibata (quarterfinals)
  Cássio Motta /  Tim Wilkison (semifinals)
  Udo Riglewski /  Michael Stich (final)

Draw

Finals

Top half

Bottom half

External links
 Draw

Doubles
1990 Doubles